The ABC Region is an industrial region in Greater São Paulo, Brazil.

The name refers to three smaller cities south of São Paulo, capital of the Brazilian state of the same name. Originally, these three cities were Santo André, São Bernardo do Campo, and São Caetano do Sul. Later, the region became known as the ABCD, with the addition of the city of Diadema, and sometimes even as ABCDMRR, with the addition of Mauá, Ribeirão Pires, and Rio Grande da Serra. The ABC region is widely known in Brazil and abroad because of the great number of international companies, particularly car manufacturers, in its area. National media and organizations consider ABC a powerful industrial pole and birthplace of the labor union movement that fought against dictatorship in the 1970s and 1980s. In this region was formed the Workers' Party (PT) whose activities and popularity launched Luiz Inácio Lula da Silva, or simply Lula, to the president of Brazil in 2002.  In 2006, the Universidade Federal do ABC was established.

Population
Total Population : 2,546,135 inhabitants (2010)
Santo André: 673,914 inhabitants – Literacy rate: 95.9%
São Bernardo do Campo: 765,203 – Literacy rate: 95.4%
São Caetano do Sul: 149,571 – Literacy rate: 97.2%
Diadema: 386,039 – Literacy rate: 93.8%
Mauá: 417,281 – Literacy rate: 94%
Ribeirão Pires: 113,043 - Literacy rate: 95%
Rio Grande da Serra: 44,084 - Literacy rate: 92.4%

Classes
Class A/B: 70%
Class C : 25%
Class D/E: 5%

Source: Brazilian Census 2000 and Brazilian Census 2010 (population).

See also
Santo André
São Bernardo do Campo
São Caetano do Sul
Diadema
Mauá
Ribeirão Pires
Rio Grande da Serra

References

Agência ABC - http://www.agenciagabc.com.br/
Consórcio do Grande ABC - https://web.archive.org/web/20060206220932/http://consorcioabc.org.br/
Newspapers: Diário do Grande ABC - http://www.dgabc.com.br/ ; Repórter Diário - http://www.reporterdiario.com.br/

Metropolitan areas of São Paulo
Santo André, São Paulo
São Bernardo do Campo
São Caetano do Sul